Romeo Bertani (born 17 May 1999) is an Italia footballer who plays as a midfielder for Serie D club Arzignano.

Club career
In July 2019, Bertani moved to Serie C club AlbinoLeffe on a free transfer.

On 2 September 2020, he signed with Arzignano.

References

External links

1999 births
Living people
U.C. AlbinoLeffe players
Serie C players
Italian footballers
Association football midfielders
A.S.D. Mezzolara players